Kwekwe East was a constituency of the House of Assembly of the Parliament of Zimbabwe between 1985 and 1990. Its first and only MP, elected in the 1985 parliamentary election, was Emmerson Mnangagwa of ZANU–PF.

Electoral history

References 

1985 establishments in Zimbabwe
1990s disestablishments in Zimbabwe
Constituencies established in 1985
Constituencies disestablished in 1990
Kwekwe
Parliamentary constituencies in Zimbabwe